Christopher R. Scotese (born 4 May 1953) is an American geologist and paleogeographer. He received his PhD from the University of Chicago in 1985. He is the creator of the Paleomap Project, which aims to map Earth over the last billion years, and is credited with predicting Pangaea Ultima, a possible future supercontinent configuration. Later Dr. Scotese changed Pangaea Ultima to Pangaea Proxima to alleviate confusion about the name Pangaea Ultima, which would imply that it would be the last supercontinent.

Professor Scotese retired from teaching at the University of Texas, Arlington, Department of Earth and Environmental Sciences in 2013. He is now a research associate at the Field Museum of Natural History and an adjunct professor in the Department of Earth and Environmental Sciences, Northwestern University.  He continues to collaborate with several research groups on topics concerning the history of the Earth System, but his main focus is a book entitled: "Earth History, the Evolution of the Earth System". He is the coauthor of more than 100 scientific publications, and his maps and animations have been used in numerous geological textbooks, scientific research papers, and are on display in museums worldwide.

Selected publications

 
 Chatterjee, S., Scotese, C.R., Bajpai, S., 2017.  The Restless Indian Plate and Its Epic Voyage from Gondwana to Asia: Its Tectonic, Paleoclimate, and Paleobiogeographic Evolution, Geological Society of America, Special Paper 529, 147 pp.
 
 
 Scotese, C.R., and Schettino, A., 2017.  Late Permian – Early Jurassic Paleogeography of Western Tethys and the World, Chapter 3, in Permo-Triassic Salt Provinces of Europe, North Africa and the Atlantic Margins, Elsevier, p. 57 – 95,

References

External links
Continents in Collision: Pangea Ultima
The Paleomap Project
 
CR Scotese profile in ResearchGate
 Global Geology website

American geologists
American paleogeographers
Living people
1953 births
People associated with the Field Museum of Natural History
Scientists from Chicago
University of Chicago alumni
University of Texas at Arlington faculty